General Manouchehr Hashemi  (Persian: منوچهر هاشمی; 16 July 1918, Khoy — 7 October 2007) was an Iranian intelligence officer for the Shah's SAVAK. He was the head of the provincial offices of SAVAK in Fars and Khorasan provinces, and later head of its counter-intelligence department commonly known as department VIII. After his career as an Army Infantry officer, he became one of SAVAK's longest-serving senior officers (serving from 1957 to 1979), he had previously been head of the provincial offices of SAVAK in the provinces of Fars and Khorasan. Excerpts from Hashemi's history of SAVAK were published in Payam-e Emrooz in 1988.

Hashemi played a minor role in the Iran-Contra Affair, introducing Theodore Shackley to Manucher Ghorbanifar and Hassan Karroubi (brother of Mehdi Karroubi).

References

People of SAVAK
1918 births
2007 deaths